is a Japanese diplomat.

He joined the Japanese ministry of Foreign Affairs during the late 1960s. On January 30, 2002 he was dismissed from his position as Vice-Minister of Foreign Affairs following disagreement with Foreign Minister Makiko Tanaka over the participation of two NGOs in the conference regarding the reconstruction of Afghanistan, then held in Tokyo. 

From 2002 to 2004, he served as Minister at the Japanese Embassy in the United Kingdom, and from 2004 to 2008 as Japanese Ambassador to the United Kingdom. In March 2019, Nogami, spoke at the Tokyo forum on the question of whether Japan is sufficiently invested in South-east Asia. He said Japan's foreign direct investment in the region is already overtaking what it spends in China.

See also
 26th G8 summit: served as a sherpa (emissary).
 Crayon Shin-chan: Fierceness That Invites Storm! The Singing Buttocks Bomb
 Chatham House

References

External links
 "Nogami named ambassador to Britain" Japan Times, August 28, 2004

1942 births
Living people
Ambassadors of Japan to the United Kingdom
Honorary Commanders of the Order of the British Empire
University of Tokyo alumni
Consuls General of Japan in Hong Kong